Circles is the second album by The Autumn Defense, composed of multi-instrumentalists John Stirratt and Pat Sansone.

Track listing
All tracks composed by John Stirratt and Pat Sansone; except where indicated
 "Silence" (Pat Sansone)
 "The Sun in California"
 "Written in the Snow"
 "The Answer"
 "The World (Will Soon Turn Our Way)" (John Stirratt)
 "Why I'm Like This" (Jeff Tweedy, John Stirratt)
 "Tuesday Morning" (Pat Sansone)
 "Some Kind of Fool"
 "Iowa City Adieu" (John Stirratt)
 "Circles"

Personnel
The Autumn Defence 
John Stiratt - vocals, guitars, bass
Pat Sansone - vocals, guitars, bass, keyboards
Brad Jones - bass, 12-string, organ
Greg Wieczorek as Greg Wiz - drums, percussion

With:
Ryan Rapsys - drums (6, 7)
John Pirruccello - pedal steel (2)
Jeff Tweedy - electric guitar (6)
Steve Tyska - horns (6, 9, 10)
Andrew Bird - violin (4)

External links
Arena Rock Recording Co.

2003 albums
Circles
The Autumn Defense albums